Thulir is an Indian monthly children's science magazine published in Tamil by the Tamil Nadu Science Forum without a break since 1987. Its purpose is to bring science to school children, especially in rural areas. The headquarters of the monthly is in Chennai. Thulir is sustained by the support of children and teachers.

References

External links
 

1987 establishments in Tamil Nadu
Education magazines
Children's magazines published in India
Monthly magazines published in India
Science and technology magazines published in India
Magazines established in 1987
Tamil-language magazines
Mass media in Chennai